James Playfair (5 August 1755 – 23 February 1794) was a Scottish architect who worked largely in the neoclassical tradition.

Biography 
Playfair was born in Benvie near Dundee, where his father was the parish minister. He was the brother of William Playfair the engineer, and the mathematician John Playfair. His son, William Henry Playfair (1790–1857), was also a celebrated architect, responsible for many of the buildings in Edinburgh’s New Town.

James Playfair's works include Melville Castle in Midlothian and the Glens Old Parish Church, Kirriemuir (1786–1788). His most famous building is Cairness House (1791–1797), in Aberdeenshire, which used revolutionary forms of neoclassicism, and is unique in British architecture of the period. Cairness House shows the influence of the French architects Étienne-Louis Boullée and Claude Nicholas Ledoux, and is also notable for having the earliest complete Egyptian room in Britain.

On his death in 1794, most of Playfair's papers were bought by his close friend Sir John Soane and are now housed at Sir John Soane's Museum in London.

References
Parks & Gardens, UK

External links
Gazetteer for Scotland  Details
 http://www.castlehillsberwick.com/playfairexhibition/

1755 births
1794 deaths
British neoclassical architects
18th-century Scottish architects
18th-century Scottish people
Burials at Old Calton Burial Ground